Jakob Verbruggen (born in Merksem in 1980) is a Belgian television and film director. He studied at the Royal Institute for Theatre, Cinema and Sound (RITCS) in Belgium.

Career 
He has directed episodes of The Fall, London Spy, and House of Cards. In 2016 he directed "Men Against Fire", an episode of the third series of the anthology series Black Mirror. In 2017 he directed the first three episodes of the event series The Alienist. Deadline revealed in August 2020 that Verbruggen joined as director and executive producer of Invasion.

Filmography

References

External links 
 

1980 births
Living people
Belgian film directors
Belgian television directors
Mass media people from Antwerp